The Gardner School for Girls was an American private school for girls that operated in New York City, New York, in the 19th and 20th centuries.

History
The school was established in 1860 by a Baptist minister. The school was headed for many years by Mrs. Charles H. Gardner.

For several decades it was located at 607 Fifth Avenue, between 48th and 49th Streets. Later, from 1916 to 1933 the school was located at 11 East 51st Street in the former home of John Peirce, between Madison and Fifth Avenues.

Notable students
Among the women who attended the Gardner School were the following:
 Carman Barnes – writer 
 Patricia Ellis – actress
 Mary Hatcher, actress and singer
 Blanche Knopf – publisher
 Mary Craig Sinclair – writer

See also

References

Organizations with year of disestablishment missing
Defunct girls' schools in the United States
Defunct schools in New York City
Fifth Avenue
Girls' schools in New York City
Midtown Manhattan
Private schools in Manhattan

1860 establishments in New York (state)
Educational institutions established in 1860